Huddersfield Town's 2009–10 campaign was the club's first full season under the chairmanship of Dean Hoyle, with manager Lee Clark in his first full season in charge of the team. They finished in 6th place, before losing to Millwall in the play-offs.

Squad at the start of the season

Review
After the end of the centenary season, Dean Hoyle made wholesale changes at the club. As well as the retirement of Andy Booth, Clark released Jon Worthington, Malvin Kamara, Dominik Werling, Daniel Broadbent, Dan Codman. Danny Cadamarteri and Andy Holdsworth both rejected new deals and subsequently left the club. Cadamarteri joined Scottish Premier League side Dundee United, then a week later, ex-captain Worthington joined fellow League One side Oldham Athletic. On 16 July, young striker Tom Denton joined Football League Two side Cheltenham Town on a six-month loan deal. He returned to the club on 10 November, two months earlier than anticipated. On 22 July, midfielder Ian Craney and striker Phil Jevons joined League Two side Morecambe on season-long loans. Unfortunately, an injury cut short half of Craney's season, and he returned to the Galpharm on 20 April. The following day, his contract at the club was terminated. Also that day, Keigan Parker and Andy Holdsworth joined Oldham Athletic, following Jon Worthington. On 25 July, young goalkeeper Simon Eastwood joined Bradford City on loan until the end of the year. He returned to the Galpharm on 31 December. On 4 August, Eastwood was joined at Bradford by Michael Flynn after terminating his contract at the Galpharm. Kamara joined Conference National side Barrow on 25 September. On 14 December, young defender Spencer Harris moved to Northern Premier League Division One North side Curzon Ashton on a month's loan. On 1 January 2010, midfielder Jim Goodwin joined Oldham Athletic on a month's loan, which was extended to the end of the season on 1 February. On 7 January, defender Andy Butler joined Championship side Blackpool on loan until the end of the season. On 13 January, goalkeeper Matt Glennon terminated his contract with the Terriers, so he could join Bradford City on a permanent deal. On 21 January, left-back Joe Skarz joined League Two side Shrewsbury Town on loan until the end of the season. The following day, 2 of the team's youngsters, Jack Hunt & Leigh Franks were sent on loan to Conference National side Grays Athletic and Conference North side Fleetwood Town respectively. On 27 January, Lionel Ainsworth joined fellow League One side Brentford on a month's loan, which was extended to the end of the season on 1 February. On 1 February, Tom Denton and Lewis Nightingale joined Northern Premier League Division One North side Wakefield on one-month loans. On 17 March, young defender Spencer Harris was released from his contract, then signed for Ossett Town. On 17 May 2010, former captain Chris Lucketti left the club.

On 29 May, Clark made his first signing of the summer, by bringing in Tranmere Rovers captain Antony Kay on a free transfer. On 12 June, Clark signed defender Peter Clarke on a free transfer from Southend United. On 18 June, Coventry City striker Robbie Simpson was signed for £300,000 on a three-year deal. On 30 June, Lee Peltier was signed from Yeovil Town on a three-year contract for an undisclosed fee. On 3 July, young striker Theo Robinson was signed from Football League Championship side Watford for an undisclosed fee on a three-year deal. On 31 July, Ipswich Town striker Jordan Rhodes joined the Terriers on a four-year deal for an undisclosed fee. On 14 August, Clark signed Manchester United and England U-19 midfielder Danny Drinkwater on a season-long loan from Old Trafford. On 19 January, Birmingham City defender Krystian Pearce joined on an original emergency loan, to be made into a permanent deal. On 22 January, Lee Clark bolstered his defensive options further with the loan signing of Preston North End's Neal Trotman. On 28 January, Clark made a double signing, Australian international Dean Heffernan signed until the end of the season from A-League side Central Coast Mariners and young striker Nathan Eccleston signed on a month's loan from Liverpool. On 18 February, after impressing on a trial, young midfielder Taser Hassan signed a contract with the Terriers until the end of the season.

Town finished in 6th place, meaning that they played Millwall in the play-offs. After a goalless first leg at the Galpharm, Huddersfield lost the second leg 2–0 at The New Den, meaning that they stay in League One for another season.

Squad at the end of the season

Players in and out

In

Out

Final league table

Results

Pre-season matches

Football League One

Football League play-offs

FA Cup

Football League Cup

Football League Trophy

Appearances & goals

References

Huddersfield Town A.F.C. seasons
Huddersfield Town